Azes I (Greek:  , epigraphically  ; Kharosthi:) was an Indo-Scythian ruler who ruled around c. 48/47 BCE – 25 BCE with a dynastic empire based in the Punjab and Indus Valley, completed the domination of the Scythians in the northwestern Indian subcontinent.

Name
Azes's name is attested on his coins in the Greek form  and the Kharosthi form , which are both derived from the Saka name , meaning "leader".

History
 Maues and his successors had conquered the areas of Gandhara, as well as the area of Mathura from 85 BCE forming the Northern Satraps.

The Azes Era
Azes's most lasting legacy was the foundation of the Azes era. It was widely believed that the era was begun by Azes's successors by simply continuing the counting of his regnal years. However, Prof. Harry Falk has recently presented an inscription at several conferences which dates to Azes's reign, and suggests that the era may have been begun by Azes himself. Most popular historians date the start of the Azes era to 58 BC and believe it is the same as the later era known as the Malwa or Vikrama era.

However, a recently discovered inscription, the Bajaur reliquary inscription, dated in both the Azes and the Greek era suggests that actually this is not the case. The inscription gives the relationship Azes = Greek + 128. It is believed that the Greek era may have begun in 173 BCE, exactly 300 years before the first year of the Era of Kanishka. If that is the case then the Azes era would begin in about 45 BC.

Azes I and Azes II identical?
According to Senior, Azes I may have been identical with Azes II, due to the discovery of an overstrike of the former over the latter.

See also
Yuezhi
Greco-Bactrian Kingdom
Indo-Greek Kingdom
Indo-Parthian Kingdom
Kushan Empire

Notes

References

External links
 Coins of Azes I
 Discussion of the Azes and Greek Era

Indo-Scythian kings
1st-century BC Iranian monarchs
1st-century BC Iranian people